Catena is a surname. Notable people with the surname include:

Gerardo Catena (1902–2000), American mobster
Elena Catena (1920–2012), Spanish academic
Laura I. Catena (born 1967), Argentine vintner, physician and author
Marina Catena, Italian soldier and United Nations official
Paulus Catena (fl. 353–362), Roman notary and investigator
Tom Catena (born 1964), American physician and humanitarian.
Vincenzo Catena (–1531), Italian painter